The anti-Azerbaijani sentiment, or anti-Azerbaijanism has been mainly rooted in several countries, most notably in Armenia and Iran, where anti-Azerbaijani sentiment has sometimes led to violent ethnic incidents.

Armenia 
According to a 2012 opinion poll, 63% of Armenians perceive Azerbaijan as "the biggest enemy of Armenia" while 94% of Azerbaijanis consider Armenia to be "the biggest enemy of Azerbaijan." The root of the hostility against Azerbaijanis traced from the Nagorno-Karabakh conflict.

Early period 

In the early 20th century the Transcaucasian Armenians began to equate the Azerbaijani people with the perpetrators of anti-Armenian policies such as the Armenian genocide in the Ottoman Empire.

In March 1918, during a Bolshevik takeover, later called the March Days, an estimate of 3,000 to 10,000 Azerbaijanis were killed by Bolshevic troops and ethnic Armenian militias, orchestrated by the Bolshevist Stepan Shahumyan.

During the Nagorno-Karabakh conflict 

After the First Nagorno-Karabakh War anti-Azerbaijani sentiment grew in Armenia, leading to harassment of Azerbaijanis there. In the beginning of 1988 the first refugee waves from Armenia reached Baku. In 1988, Azerbaijanis and Kurds (around 167,000 people) were expelled from the Armenian SSR. Following the Karabakh movement, initial violence erupted in the form of the murder of both Armenians and Azerbaijanis and border skirmishes. As a result of these skirmishes, 214 Azerbaijanis were killed.

On June 7, 1988 Azerbaijanis were evicted from the town of Masis near the Armenian–Turkish border, and on June 20 five Azerbaijani villages were emptied in the Ararat Province. Henrik Pogosian was ultimately forced to retire, blamed for letting nationalism develop freely. Although purges of the Armenian and Azerbaijani party structures were made against those who had fanned or not sought to prevent ethnic strife, as a whole, the measures taken are believed to be meager.

The year 1993 was marked by the highest wave of the Azerbaijani internally displaced persons, when the Karabakh Armenian forces occupied territories beyond the Nagorno-Karabakh borders. The Karabakhi Armenians ultimately succeeded in removing Azerbaijanis from Nagorno-Karabakh.

After the First Nagorno-Karabakh War 

On January 16, 2003 Robert Kocharian said that Azerbaijanis and Armenians were "ethnically incompatible" and it was impossible for the Armenian population of Karabakh to live within an Azerbaijani state. Speaking on 30 January in Strasbourg, Council of Europe Secretary-General Walter Schwimmer said Kocharian's comment was tantamount to warmongering. Parliamentary Assembly of the Council of Europe President Peter Schieder said he hopes Kocharian's remark was incorrectly translated, adding that "since its creation, the Council of Europe has never heard the phrase "ethnic incompatibility".

In 2010 an initiative to hold a festival of Azerbaijani films in Yerevan was blocked due to popular opposition. Similarly, in 2012 a festival of Azerbaijani short films, organized by the Armenia-based Caucasus Center for Peace-Making Initiatives and supported by the U.S. and British embassies, which was scheduled to open on April 12, was canceled in Gyumri after protesters blocked the festival venue.

On September 2, 2015, the  Minister of Justice Arpine Hovhannisyan on her personal Facebook page shared an article link featuring her interview with the Armenian news website Tert.am where she condemned the sentencing of an Azerbaijani journalist and called the human rights situation in Azerbaijan "appalling". Subsequently, the minister came under criticism for liking a racist comment on the aforementioned Facebook post by Hovhannes Galajyan, editor-in-chief of local Armenian newspaper Iravunk; On the post, Galajyan had commented in Armenian: "What human rights when even purely biologically a Turk cannot be considered a human".

Mosques in Armenia 

The Blue Mosque is the only functioning and one of the two remaining mosques in present-day Yerevan. In the opinion of the journalist Thomas de Waal, writing out Azerbaijanis of Armenia from history was made easier by a linguistic sleight of hand, as the name "Azeri" or "Azerbaijani" was not in common usage before the twentieth century, and these people were referred to as "Tartars", "Turks" or simply "Muslims". De Waal adds that "Yet they were neither Persians nor Turks; they were Turkic-speaking Shiite subjects of the Safavid Dynasty of the Iranian Empire". According to De Waal, when the Blue Mosque is referred to as Persian it "obscures the fact that most of the worshippers there, when it was built in the 1760s, would have been, in effect, Azerbaijanis".

The other remaining mosque in Yerevan, the  Tapabashy Mosque was likely built in 1687 during the Safavid dynasty in the historic Kond district. Today, only the 1.5 meter-thick walls and sections of its outer perimeter roof still stand.  The main dome collapsed in the 1960s (1980's according to residents and neighbors), though a smaller dome still stands. The mosque was used as by Armenian refugees following the Armenian genocide and their descendants still live inside the mosque today. According to residents, the Azerbaijanis of Yerevan still held some sort of prayer service up until they left for Baku in 1988 due to the tensions surrounding the war. The remnants of the mosque are protected by the Armenian state as a historical monument. In 2021, Armenia issued a tender to restore and reconstruct the historic Kond district including the mosque.

In the Syunik Province of Armenia, the remaining Azerbaijani mosques in the towns of Kapan, Sisian, and Meghri are maintained by the state under the Non-Armenian historical and cultural Monuments in Syunik designation.

Iran 

The anti-Azerbaijani sentiment is rooted in the hostility in the 1990s, during which Iran was blamed by Azerbaijan for supporting Armenia in the First Nagorno-Karabakh War despite the Iranian government claimed it helped Azerbaijan. Therefore, a sense of hostility against Azerbaijan developed in Iran as a result, fostering an alliance between Iran and Armenia.

In 2006, a cartoon controversy with regard to Azerbaijani people had led to unrest as the Azerbaijanis have been compared to cockroaches by the Iranian-speaking majority population. During 2012, fans of Tractor Sazi, an Azerbaijani-dominated football club, chanted anti-Iranian rhetorics, raising their voice against oppression of ethnic Azerbaijanis by the Iranian government and their neglect after the East Azerbaijan earthquakes; the Iranian police force responded violently, arresting dozens. Azerbaijani activists have also increasingly faced  harassments by the Iranian government for its effort to protect the Azerbaijani minority in Iran.

Georgia 
During Georgia's movement toward independence from the Soviet Union, the Azeri population expressed fear for its fate in independent Georgia. In the late 1980s, most ethnic Azeris occupying local government positions in the Azeri-populated areas were removed from their positions. In 1989, there were changes in the ethnic composition of the local authorities and the resettlement of thousands of migrants who had suffered from landslides in the mountainous region of Svaneti. The local Azeri population, accepting the migrants at first, demanded only to resolve the problem of Azeri representation on the municipal level. The demands were ignored; later the migrants, culturally different from the local population and facing social hardships, were accused of attacks and robbery against the Azeris, which in turn led to demonstrations, ethnic clashes between Svans and Azeris, demands for an Azeri autonomy in Borchali and for the expulsion of Svan immigrants from Kvemo-Kartli. The antagonism reached its peak during the presidency of Zviad Gamsakhurdia (1991–1992), when hundreds of Azeri families were forcibly evicted from their homes in Dmanisi and Bolnisi by nationalist paramilitaries and fled to Azerbaijan. Thousands of Azeris emigrated in fear of nationalist policies. In his speech in Kvareli, Gamsakhurdia accused the Azeri population of Kakheti of "holding up their heads and measuring swords with Kakheti". The Georgian nationalist press expressed concern with regard to the fast natural growth of the Azeri population.

Although ethnic oppression in the 1990s did not take place on a wide scale, minorities in Georgia, especially Azeris, Abkhazians and Ossetians, encountered the problem of dealing with nationalist organisations established in some parts of the country. Previously not prone to migrating, Azeris became the second-largest emigrating ethnic community in Georgia in the early 1990s, with three-quarters of these mainly rural emigrants leaving for Azerbaijan and the rest for Russia. Unlike other minority groups, many remaining Azeris cited attachment to their home communities and unwillingness to leave behind well-developed farms as their reason to stay. Furthermore, Georgian-born Azeris who immigrated to Azerbaijan at various times, including 50,000 Georgian-born spouses of Azerbaijani citizens, reported bureaucratic problems faced in Azerbaijan, with some unable to acquire Azerbaijani citizenship for nearly 20 years.

See also
Anti-Turkish sentiment
List of massacres in Azerbaijan

References

External links
Armenian-Azeri Mutual Perceptions Project

Azerbaijani
Nagorno-Karabakh conflict
 
Azerbaijani